Jeffery Forehand is an American college baseball coach and former second baseman. Forehand is the head coach of the Lipscomb Bisons baseball team.

Early life
Forehand attended Belmont University, where he played for the Belmont Bruins baseball team.

Coaching career
On May 5, 2005, Forehand was named the TranSouth Athletic Conference Coach of the Year for a second consecutive year.

On June 6, 2006, Forehand was named the head coach of the Lipscomb Bisons baseball program.
In 2015, Forehand was named to the Trevecca Hall of Fame.

Head coaching record

See also
 List of current NCAA Division I baseball coaches

References

External links

Lipscomb Bisons bio

Living people
Belmont Bruins baseball players
Columbia Mules players
High school baseball coaches in the United States
Trevecca Nazarene Trojans baseball coaches
Lipscomb Bisons baseball coaches
Year of birth missing (living people)